The Shoshone or Shoshoni ( or ) are a Native American tribe with four large cultural/linguistic divisions: 
 Eastern Shoshone: Wyoming
 Northern Shoshone: southern Idaho
 Western Shoshone: Nevada, northern Utah
 Goshute:  western Utah, eastern Nevada

They traditionally speak the Shoshoni language, part of the Numic languages branch of the large Uto-Aztecan language family. The Shoshone were sometimes called the Snake Indians by neighboring tribes and early American explorers.

Their peoples have become members of federally recognized tribes throughout their traditional areas of settlement, often co-located with the Northern Paiute people of the Great Basin.

Etymology
The name "Shoshone" comes from Sosoni, a Shoshone word for high-growing grasses. Some neighboring tribes call the Shoshone "Grass House People," based on their traditional homes made from sosoni. Shoshones call themselves Newe, meaning "People".

Meriwether Lewis recorded the tribe as the "Sosonees or snake Indians" in 1805.

Language
The Shoshoni language is spoken by approximately 1,000 people today. It belongs to the Central Numic branch of the Uto-Aztecan language family.  Speakers are scattered from central Nevada to central Wyoming.

The largest numbers of Shoshoni speakers live on the federally recognized Duck Valley Indian Reservation, located on the border of Nevada and Idaho; and Goshute Reservation in Utah. Idaho State University also offers Shoshoni-language classes.

History

The Shoshone are a Native American tribe, who originated in the western Great Basin and spread north and east into present-day Idaho and Wyoming.  By 1500, some Eastern Shoshone had crossed the Rocky Mountains into the Great Plains. After 1750, warfare and pressure from the Blackfoot, Crow, Lakota, Cheyenne, and Arapaho pushed Eastern Shoshone south and westward. Some of them moved as far south as Texas, emerging as the Comanche by 1700.

As more European-American settlers migrated west, tensions rose with the indigenous people over competition for territory and resources.  Wars occurred throughout the second half of the 19th century.  The Northern Shoshone, led by Chief Pocatello, fought during the 1860s against settlers in Idaho (where the city Pocatello was named for him). As more settlers encroached on Shoshone hunting territory, the natives raided farms and ranches for food and attacked immigrants.

The warfare resulted in the Bear River Massacre (1863) when US forces attacked and killed an estimated 250 Northwestern Shoshone, who were at their winter encampment in present-day Franklin County, Idaho. A large number of the dead were non-combatants, including children, deliberately killed by the soldiers. This was the highest number of deaths which the Shoshone suffered at the hands of United States forces. 21 US soldiers were also killed.

During the American Civil War travelers continued to migrate westward along the Westward Expansion Trails. When the Shoshone, along with the Utes participated in attacks on the mail route that ran west out of Fort Laramie, the mail route had to be relocated south of the trail through Wyoming.

Allied with the Bannock, to whom they were related, the Shoshone fought against the United States in the Snake War from 1864 to 1868.  They fought US forces together in 1878 in the Bannock War.  In 1876, by contrast, the Shoshone fought alongside the U.S. Army in the Battle of the Rosebud against their traditional enemies, the Lakota and Cheyenne.

In 1879 a band of approximately 300 Eastern Shoshone (known as "Sheepeaters") became involved in the Sheepeater Indian War. It was the last Indian war fought in the Pacific Northwest region of the present-day United States.

In 1911 a small group of Bannock under a leader named Mike Daggett, also known as "Shoshone Mike," killed four ranchers in Washoe County, Nevada. The settlers formed a posse and went out after the Native Americans.  They caught up with the Bannock band on February 25, 1911, and in a gun battle killed Mike Daggett and seven members of his band.  They lost one man of the posse, Ed Hogle. in the Battle of Kelley Creek. The posse captured a baby, two children and a young  woman. (The three older captives died of diseases within a year; the baby, Mary Jo Estep, died in 1992).

A rancher donated the partial remains of three adult males, two adult females, two adolescent males, and three children (believed to be Mike Daggett and his family, according to contemporary accounts) to the Smithsonian Institution in Washington, DC, for study. In 1994, the institution repatriated the remains to the Fort Hall Idaho Shoshone-Bannock Tribe.

In 2008 the Northwestern Band of the Shoshone Nation acquired the site of the Bear River Massacre and some surrounding land.  They wanted to protect the holy land and to build a memorial to the massacre, the largest their nation had suffered. "In partnership with the American West Heritage Center and state leaders in Idaho and Utah, the tribe has developed public/private partnerships to advance tribal cultural preservation and economic development goals."  They have become leaders in developing tribal renewable energy.

Historical population
In 1845 the estimated population of Northern and Western Shoshone was 4,500, much reduced after they had suffered infectious disease epidemics and warfare. The completion of the First transcontinental railroad in 1869 was followed by European-American immigrants arriving in unprecedented numbers in the territory.

In 1937 the Bureau of Indian Affairs counted 3,650 Northern Shoshone and 1,201 Western Shoshone. As of the 2000 census, some 12,000 persons identified as Shoshone.

Bands
Shoshone people are divided into traditional bands based both on their homelands and primary food sources. These include:

 Eastern Shoshone people:
 Guchundeka', Kuccuntikka, Buffalo Eaters
 Tukkutikka, Tukudeka, Mountain Sheep Eaters, joined the Northern Shoshone
 Boho'inee', Pohoini, Pohogwe, Sage Grass people, Sagebrush Butte People

 Northern Shoshone people:
 Agaideka, Salmon Eaters, Lemhi, Snake River and Lemhi River Valley
 Doyahinee', Mountain people
 Kammedeka, Kammitikka, Jack Rabbit Eaters, Snake River, Great Salt Lake
 Hukundüka, Porcupine Grass Seed Eaters, Wild Wheat Eaters, possibly synonymous with Kammitikka
 Tukudeka, Dukundeka', Sheep Eaters (Mountain Sheep Eaters), Sawtooth Range, Idaho
 Yahandeka, Yakandika, Groundhog Eaters, lower Boise, Payette, and Wiser Rivers

 Western Shoshone people:

Kusiutta, Goshute (Gosiute), Great Salt Desert and Great Salt Lake, Utah
Cedar Valley Goshute
Deep Creek Goshute
Rush Valley Goshute
Skull Valley Goshute, Wipayutta, Weber Ute
Tooele Valley Goshute
Trout Creek Goshute
Kuyatikka, Kuyudikka, Bitterroot Eaters, Halleck, Mary's River, Clover Valley, Smith Creek Valley, Nevada
Mahaguadüka, Mentzelia Seed Eaters, Ruby Valley, Nevada
Painkwitikka, Penkwitikka, Fish Eaters, Cache Valley, Idaho and Utah
Pasiatikka, Redtop Grass Eaters, Deep Creek Gosiute, Deep Creek Valley, Antelope Valley
Tipatikka, Pinenut Eaters, northernmost band
Tsaiduka, Tule Eaters, Railroad Valley, Nevada
Tsogwiyuyugi, Elko, Nevada
Waitikka, Ricegrass Eaters, Ione Valley, Nevada
Watatikka, Ryegrass Seed Eaters, Ruby Valley, Nevada
Wiyimpihtikka, Buffalo Berry Eaters

Reservations and Indian colonies

Battle Mountain Reservation, Lander County, Nevada. Current reservation population is 165 and total tribal enrollment is 516. 
Duck Valley Indian Reservation, southern Idaho/northern Nevada, (Western) Shoshone-Paiute Tribes
Elko Indian Colony, Elko County, Nevada
Ely Shoshone Indian Reservation in Ely, Nevada, 111 acres (0.45 km²), 500 members
Fallon Paiute-Shoshone Reservation near Fallon, Nevada, 8,200 acres (33 km²), 991 members, Western Shoshone and Paiute
Fort Hall Indian Reservation, 544,000 acres (2,201 km²) in Idaho, Lemhi Shoshone with the Bannock Indians, a Paiute band with which they have merged
Fort McDermitt Indian Reservation, Nevada and Oregon, Fort McDermitt Paiute and Shoshone Tribe
Goshute Indian Reservation, 111,000 acres (449 km²) in Nevada and Utah, Western Shoshone
Lemhi Indian Reservation (1875–1907) in Idaho, Lemhi Shoshone, removed to Fort Hall Reservation
Northwestern Shoshone Indian Reservation, Utah, Northwestern Band of Shoshone Nation of Utah (Washakie)
Reno-Sparks Indian Colony, Nevada, 1,988 acres (8 km²), total 481 members of Shoshone, Paiute, and Washoe bands
Skull Valley Indian Reservation, 18,000 acres (73 km²) in Utah, Western Shoshone
South Fork Odgers Ranch Indian Colony, Elko County, Nevada
Wells Indian Colony, Elko County, Nevada
Wind River Reservation, population 2,650 Eastern Shoshone, 2,268,008 acres (9,178 km²) of reservation in Wyoming are shared with the Northern Arapaho

Notable people

 Sacagawea (1788–1812), Lemhi Shoshone guide of the Lewis and Clark Expedition
 Jean Baptiste Charbonneau (1805–1866) son of Sacagawea, explorer, guide, military scout
 Cameahwait, chief in the early 19th century
 Bear Hunter (d. 1863), war chief
 Old Toby
 Ned Blackhawk (b. ca. 1970), historian and professor at Yale
 Mary Dann and Carrie Dann
 Randy'L He-dow Teton
 Chief Washakie
 Chief Pocatello
 Lolly Vegas, lead singer of Redbone (band)
 Taboo (rapper), member of the Black Eyed Peas (Shoshone grandmother)

See also

 Battle of Kelley Creek
 United States v. Shoshone Tribe of Indians
 Western Shoshone traditional narratives

Notes

References
 Murphy, Robert A., and Yolanda Murphy. "Northern Shoshone and Bannock." Warren L. d'Azevedo, volume editor. Handbook of North American Indians: Great Basin, Volume 11.  Washington, DC: Smithsonian Institution, 1986: 284–307. .
 Shimkin, Demitri B. "Eastern Shoshone." Warren L. d'Azevedo, volume editor. Handbook of North American Indians: Great Basin, Volume 11.  Washington, DC: Smithsonian Institution, 1986: 308–335. .
 Thomas, David H., Lorann S.A. Pendleton, and Stephen C. Cappannari. "Western Shoshone." Warren L. d'Azevedo, volume editor. Handbook of North American Indians: Great Basin, Volume 11.  Washington, DC: Smithsonian Institution, 1986: 262–283. .

Further reading

External links

Northern Shoshone treaties
Great Basin Indian Archives
Reno-Sparks Indian Colony
Te-Moak Tribe of the Western Shoshone Indians of Nevada
Timbisha Tribe of the Western Shoshone Nation
U.S. Treaty with the Western Shoshone 1863, Ruby Valley
Western Shoshone Defense Project
 The Sheepeaters

 
Indigenous peoples of the Great Basin
Native American tribes in Colorado
Native American tribes in Idaho
Native American tribes in Montana
Native American tribes in Nevada
Native American tribes in Oregon
Native American tribes in Utah
Native American tribes in Wyoming